Richard Coffin may refer to:

Richard Coffin (1456–1523), Sheriff of Devon
Richard Coffin (1623–1700), Sheriff of Devon
Richard Coffin (1684–1766), British politician, MP for Barnstaple

See also
Richard Pine-Coffin (1908–1974), British army officer